The men's 1000 metres in speed skating at the 1976 Winter Olympics took place on 12 February, at the Eisschnellaufbahn.

Records
Prior to this competition, the existing world and Olympic records were as follows:

The following new Olympic records was set during the competition.

Results

References

Men's speed skating at the 1976 Winter Olympics